The 2018 FIBA U16 Women's European Championship Division C was the 14th edition of the Division C of the FIBA U16 Women's European Championship, the third tier of the European women's under-16 basketball championship. It was played in Chișinău, Moldova, from 3 to 8 July 2018. Austria women's national under-16 basketball team won the tournament.

Participating teams

First round

Group A

Group B

5th–8th place playoffs

Championship playoffs

Final standings

References

External links
FIBA official website

2018
2018–19 in European women's basketball
FIBA U16
FIBA
Sport in Chișinău